The 2014 CME Group Tour Championship was the fourth CME Group Tour Championship, a women's professional golf tournament and the season-ending event on the U.S.-based LPGA Tour. It was played at the Gold Course of Tiburón Golf Club in Naples, Florida. Lydia Ko won a three-way sudden-death playoff on the fourth hole over co-runner-up Carlota Ciganda; Julieta Granada had been eliminated on the second extra hole.

The CME Group Tour Championship also marked the end of the season-long "Race to the CME Globe" in 2014. Each player's season-long "Race to the CME Globe" points were "reset" before the tournament based on their position in the points list. "Championship points" were then awarded to the top 40 players in the CME Group Tour Championship which were added to their "reset points" to determine the overall winner of the "Race to the CME Globe". Third in the standings entering the tournament, Ko won the "Race to the CME Globe" and received a $1 million bonus. Stacy Lewis, the pre-tournament leader, finished second in the race with Michelle Wie third.

Format

Qualification
Called the "CME Group Titleholders" for its first three editions, qualification for the tournament changed for 2014. Previously, the top three finishers in each tournament, not previously qualified, earned entry to the tournament. For 2014 the field was determined by a season-long points race, the "Race to the CME Globe". All players making the cut in a tournament earned points,  with 500 points going to the winner. The five major championships had a higher points distribution, with 625 points to the winner. No-cut tournaments only awarded points to the top 40 finishers (top 20 for the Lorena Ochoa Invitational).

Only LPGA members were eligible to earn points. The top 72 players on the "Race to the CME Globe" points list gained entry into the CME Group Titleholders Championship as well as any tournament winners, whether or not an LPGA member, not in the top 72.

Field
1. Top 72 LPGA members and those tied for 72nd on the "Race to the CME Globe" Points Standings
Marina Alex (T68), Dori Carter (70), Chella Choi (8), Na Yeon Choi (16), Carlota Ciganda (T64), Paula Creamer (17), Laura Diaz (72), Austin Ernst (37), Jodi Ewart Shadoff (48), Shanshan Feng (6), Sandra Gal (39), Julieta Granada (24), Caroline Hedwall (56), Mi Jung Hur (34), Karine Icher (26), Eun-Hee Ji (35), Tiffany Joh (T61), Jennifer Johnson (49), Moriya Jutanugarn (T61), Danielle Kang (55), Haeji Kang (54), Kim Kaufman (T64), Cristie Kerr (14), Christina Kim (23), In-Kyung Kim (52), Katherine Kirk (57), Lydia Ko (3), Jessica Korda (15), Candie Kung (71), Brittany Lang (28), Ilhee Lee (29), Meena Lee (27), Mi Hyang Lee (25), Mirim Lee (11), Amelia Lewis (66), Stacy Lewis (1), Brittany Lincicome (18), Pernilla Lindberg (41), Mo Martin (36), Caroline Masson (31), Catriona Matthew (38), Sydnee Michaels (67), Belen Mozo (59), Azahara Muñoz (10), Haru Nomura (42), Anna Nordqvist (7), Lee-Anne Pace (T43), Hee Young Park (40), Inbee Park (2), Suzann Pettersen (12), Pornanong Phatlum (22), Gerina Piller (33), Morgan Pressel (30), Beatriz Recari (50), So Yeon Ryu (5), Lizette Salas (20), Dewi Claire Schreefel (T68), Jenny Shin (21), Sarah Jane Smith (63), Angela Stanford (19), Thidapa Suwannapura (53), Lexi Thompson (13), Yani Tseng (46), Ayako Uehara (58), Mariajo Uribe (T43), Karrie Webb (9), Michelle Wie (4), Sun Young Yoo (51)

Eligible but did not compete: Mina Harigae (45), Se-ri Pak (60), Line Vedel (47), Amy Yang (32)

2. LPGA Members, not otherwise qualified, who won at least one official LPGA tournament during the season
None

3. Non-members who won at least one official LPGA tournament during the season
Baek Kyu-jung (winner of the 2014 LPGA KEB-HanaBank Championship)

Nationalities in the field

Final leaderboard
Sunday, November 23, 2014

Playoff

Race to the CME Globe

Reset points
Each player's "Race to the CME Globe" points were "reset" before the tournament based on their position in the "Race to the CME Globe" points list. The leader was given 5,000 points, the player in second place 4,500 down to 10 points for the player in 72nd place.

Final points
"Championship points" were awarded to the top 40 players in the CME Group Tour Championship which were added to their "reset points" to determine the overall winner. The winner of the CME Group Tour Championship received 3,500 points, the second place player 2,400, down to 210 points for the player finishing in 40th place. The effect of the points system is that the top three players in the reset points list prior to the Championship were guaranteed to win the "Race to the CME Globe" by winning the Championship. The top nine in the reset points list had a chance of winning the Race, depending on the performances of other players.

In addition to winning the CME Group Tour Championship, Ko also won the "Race to the CME Globe" and received a $1 million bonus. Ko was guaranteed to win the race even before the playoff since the 2,400 points she would have earned for losing in the playoff would have given her a total of 5,900 points, ahead of Stacy Lewis on 5,650. The bonus did not count on the official money list. Second place earned $150,000 and third place $100,000.

References

External links

Coverage on LPGA Tour's official site
Tiburón Golf Club − official site

CME Group Tour Championship
Golf in Florida
CME Group Tour Championship
CME Group Tour Championship
CME Group Tour Championship
CME Group Tour Championship